Lázaro Garza Ayala (17 December 1830 – 3 May 1913) was a Mexican politician who served several times as governor of Nuevo León during the 19th century.

See also
Governors of Nuevo León

References

1830 births
1913 deaths
Governors of Nuevo León
People from San Pedro Garza García, Nuevo León